A Thousand Lies is a 2006 novel by British crime writer Laura Wilson. It was shortlisted for the Duncan Lawrie Dagger award.

References  
 
 
 

2006 novels
British crime novels